Asier Goiria Etxebarria (born 19 September 1980 in Amorebieta-Etxano, Basque Country) is a Spanish former professional footballer who played as a striker.

In 2018, Goria was acting as sporting director for hometown club SD Amorebieta, one of his many employers as a player, in the Segunda División B (third tier).

References

External links

1980 births
Living people
People from Amorebieta-Etxano
Sportspeople from Biscay
Spanish footballers
Footballers from the Basque Country (autonomous community)
Association football forwards
La Liga players
Segunda División players
Segunda División B players
Tercera División players
SD Amorebieta footballers
Gernika Club footballers
Bilbao Athletic footballers
Burgos CF footballers
Logroñés CF footballers
SD Eibar footballers
CD Numancia players
FC Cartagena footballers
Girona FC players
CD Mirandés footballers
CD Getxo players